The 1985–86 Carlsberg National Basketball League season was the fourteenth season of the National Basketball League formed in 1972.

The league was sponsored by Carlsberg for the second consecutive year and the Kingston Kings completed a Play Off's & National Cup double but Manchester United won the League title.

Team changes
The EBBA increased the first division to fifteen teams adding two clubs from the second division; the two new teams were Brunel Uxbridge & Camden Ducks and the Tyneside basketball club. One club dropped out because Doncaster Panthers suffered financial trouble and were disbanded during the previous summer.
The gap in spending capability between certain teams seemed to be growing with the likes of Kingston, Manchester United and Portsmouth having much larger budgets than some of their competitors.

Carlsberg League standings

First Division

One point deducted *

Second Division

Carlsberg playoffs

Quarter-finals

Semi-finals

Third Place

Final

Prudential National Cup

Second round

Quarter-finals

Semi-finals

Final

British Masters Cup final

References

See also
Basketball in England
British Basketball League
English Basketball League
List of English National Basketball League seasons

National Basketball League (England) seasons
 
British